Big Blue River may refer to:

Big Blue River (Indiana)
Big Blue River (Kansas)
Blue River (Missouri River tributary), or Big Blue River, flows through Kansas and Missouri

See also
Big Blue River Bridge (disambiguation)
Little Blue River (disambiguation)
Blue River (disambiguation)